Langford may refer to:

Places

Australia
 Langford, Western Australia

Canada
 Langford, British Columbia, on Vancouver Island
 Rural Municipality of Langford, Manitoba

England
 Langford, Bedfordshire

 Langford, Essex
 Langford, Norfolk
 Langford, Nottinghamshire
 Langford, Oxfordshire
 Langford Budville, Somerset
 Lower Langford, Somerset
 Langford House, Durham
 Langford Hall, Nottinghamshire

United States
 Langford, Maryland
 Langford, Mississippi
 Langford, New York
 Langford, South Dakota
 Mount Langford, a mountain in Yellowstone National Park

Other uses
 Langford (surname)
 Viscount Langford
 Baron Langford
 Langford (Part One), 2007 EP by the Payolas
 Langford cultural tradition of the Oneota cultural complex
 Langford pairing

See also 
 Lankford (disambiguation)